NextEnergy Solar Fund is a large British investment company dedicated to investments in the operation of solar photovoltaic assets located in the UK and Italy. Established in 2014, the company is listed on the London Stock Exchange and is a constituent of the FTSE 250 Index. The chairman is Kevin Lyon. In January 2021, the company indicated its intention to diversify into green energy investments in Italy, Portugal and the US.

In February 2021, during the United Kingdom parliamentary second jobs controversy, the Leader of the Liberal Democrats, Sir Ed Davey, apologised to the UK Parliament after failing to declare his advisory role at the company's manager, NextEnergy Capital, when asking questions in parliament. He later resigned his role at NextEnergy.

References

External links
  Official site

Investment trusts of the United Kingdom